The Ramsau Dolomite is a dolomitic geologic formation in the Northern Limestone Alps, in Bavaria, Germany. It is a unit of the Wetterstein Limestone found in the Limestone Alps. It preserves fossils dating back to the Carnian stage of the Triassic period.

Fossil content 
The formation has provided fossils of:
Bivalves
 Cornucardia hornigii
 Daonella (Arzelella) indica
 Katosira bavarica
 Neomegalodon (Rossiodus) stoppanii
Gastropods
 Omphaloptycha rosthorni
 ?Coelostylina sp.

See also 
 List of fossiliferous stratigraphic units in Germany

References

Bibliography 
 G. Tichy. 1980. Gastropoden und Bivalven aus dem karnischen Ramsaudolomit südlich von Bad Reichenhall (Oberbayern, Bundesrepublik Deutschland) [Gastropods and bivalves from the Carnian Ramsau Dolomite south of Bad Reichenhall (Upper Bavaria, Germany)]. Geologisch-Palaeontologische Mitteilungen Innsbruck 9(6):221-238
 E. Kittl. 1912. Materialen zu einer Monographie der Halobiidae und Monotidae der Trias [Monograph on the Halobiidae and Monotidae of the Triassic]. Resultate der Wissenschaftlichen Erforschung des Balatonsees, II Band: Paläontologie der Umgebung des Balatonsees 1(4):1-229

Geologic formations of Germany
Triassic System of Europe
Triassic Germany
Carnian Stage
Dolomite formations
Shallow marine deposits
Geography of Bavaria
Geology of the Alps
Northern Limestone Alps

Ramsau Dolomite